Doryrhamphus is a genus of pipefishes, one of the two genera colloquially known as flagtail pipefishes and are popular in the aquarium trade. The members of this genus are native to the Indian and Pacific Oceans where they inhabit reef environments. Most species have a horizontal blue line along their body, and all have a whitish-edged tail that is marked contrastingly with black, red or yellow.

Species
There are currently six recognized species in this genus:
 Doryrhamphus aurolineatus J. E. Randall & Earle, 1994
 Doryrhamphus bicarinatus C. E. Dawson, 1981 (Narrowstripe pipefish)

 Doryrhamphus excisus Kaup, 1856
 Doryrhamphus excisus abbreviatus C. E. Dawson, 1981
 Doryrhamphus excisus excisus Kaup, 1856 (Bluestripe pipefish)
 Doryrhamphus excisus paulus Fritzsche, 1980
 Doryrhamphus janssi (Herald & J. E. Randall, 1972) (Janss' pipefish)
 Doryrhamphus japonicus Araga & Yoshino, 1975
 Doryrhamphus negrosensis Herre, 1934
 Doryrhamphus negrosensis malus (Whitley, 1954) (Masthead Island pipefish)
 Doryrhamphus negrosensis negrosensis Herre, 1934 (Negros pipefish)

References

External links
Ichthyological Bulletin; No. 44: Review of the Indo-Pacific pipefish genus Doryrhamphus Kaup (Pisces: Syngnathidae) with descriptions of a new species and a new subspecies

 
Marine fish genera
Taxa named by Johann Jakob Kaup